Netherlands competed at the 2004 Summer Paralympics in Athens, Greece. The team included 95 athletes, 53 men and 42 women. Competitors from Netherlands won 29 medals, including 5 gold, 12 silver and 12 bronze to finish 27th in the medal table.

Medalists

Source: www.paralympic.org

Sports

Athletics

Men's track

Men's field

Women's field

Cycling

Men's road

Men's track

Equestrian

Individual

Mixed team

Football 7-a-side
The men's football 7-a-side team didn't win any medals: they were 6th out of 8 teams.

Players
Bart Adelaars
Patrick Beekmans
Nico Berlee
Rudi van Breemen
Richard van den Born
Ruben de Haas
Stephan Lokhoff
Thieu van Son
David Tetelepta
Martijn van de Ven
Jeroen Voogd
Milo de Wit

Tournament

Goalball
The women's goalball team didn't win any medals: they were 5th out of 8 teams.

Players
Anneke Berkhout
Marianna Huijben
Christa Schrooten
Nancy Sier
Carla van der Weide Burgmeijer
Jolanda van Wijk Knuman

Tournament

Sailing

Swimming

Men

Women

Table tennis

Men

Women

Teams

Volleyball
The women's volleyball team won the silver medal after losing to China in the gold medal match.

Players
Monique Bons
Anneke den Haan
Karin Harmsen
Paula List
Djoke van Marum
Maria Poiesz
Marijke Roest
Aletta Adema Salagter
Jolanda Slenter
Alberta Ten Thije
Els Verwer
Petra Westerhof

Tournament

Wheelchair basketball
The men's basketball team didn't win any medals: they were defeated by Great Britain in the bronze medal game.

Players
Peter Brandsen
Frans van Breugel
Mustafa Charif Jebari
Ruud Dettmer
Frank de Goede
Koen Jansens
Wimt Lam
Gert Jan van der Linden
Mario Oosterbosch
Mete Oztegel
Anton de Rooy
Kornelis van der Werf

Men's tournament

The women's basketball team didn't win any medals: they were 7th out of 8 teams.

Players
Petra Garnier
Asjousja Ibrahimi
Jennette Jansen
Evelyn van Leeuwen
Cher Korver
Jozima Mosely
Roos Oosterbaan
Fleur Pieterse
Ingeborg Tiggelman
Jeanine van Veggel
Carina Versloot
Miranda Wevers

Women's tournament

Wheelchair tennis

Men

Women

Quads

See also
Netherlands at the Paralympics
Netherlands at the 2004 Summer Olympics

References 

Nations at the 2004 Summer Paralympics
2004
Summer Paralympics